Arina Maximovna Cherniavskaia (born 29 December 1998) is a Russian pair skater. With Antonio Souza-Kordeyru, she won the silver medal at the 2013 ISU Junior Grand Prix in the Czech Republic and debuted on the senior Grand Prix series at the 2014 Cup of China. In 2016, she teamed up with Evgeni Krasnopolski to compete for Israel. The pair placed 16th at the 2017 European Championships.

Programs

With Krasnopolski

With Souza-Kordeyru

Competitive highlights 
GP: Grand Prix; CS: Challenger Series; JGP: Junior Grand Prix

With Krasnopolski for Israel

With Souza-Kordeyru for Russia

References

External links 
 

1998 births
Russian female pair skaters
Living people
Figure skaters from Moscow